The Federal Institute for Materials Research and Testing (or BAM) is a German material research institute.

History
Its historical origins start in 1871, a year in which Germany was unified, as the Mechanisch-Technische Versuchsanstalt. From 1904-19 there was the Königliches Materialprüfungsamt. From 1920-45 there was the Staatliches Materialprüfungsamt (MPA) and from 1919-45 there was the Chemisch-Technische Reichsanstalt (CTR).

In 1954 the Bundesanstalt für mechanische und chemische Materialprüfung was formed, becoming the Bundesanstalt für Materialprüfung in 1956. In 1969 it became a government agency (Bundesoberbehörde). In 1986 the name changed to Bundesanstalt für Materialforschung und -prüfung.

Function
Within the interconnected fields of materials, chemistry, environment and safety, the main areas are:

 Statutory functions relating to technical safety in the public domain, especially as regards dangerous materials and substances
 Collaboration in developing statutory regulations, for example on safety standards and threshold values
 Advising the Federal Government and industry on safety aspects of materials and chemical technology
 The development and supply of reference materials and methods, in particular for chemical analysis and materials testing
 Assisting in the development of standards and technical regulations for the evaluation of substances, materials, structures and processes with reference to damage prediction and preservation of national economic values.

Structure
It is owned by the German Federal Ministry of Economics and Technology. Its competences are to improve safety in technology and chemistry through research and development, testing, analysis, approvals, advice and information.

The headquarters in Berlin are near the Berlin Botanischer Garten station.

Departments
The Federal Institute for Materials Research and Testing is subdivided into departments and divisions. The staff sums up to about 1700 members.

 Analytical chemistry; reference materials
 Chemical safety engineering
 Containment systems for dangerous goods
 Materials and environment
 Materials engineering
 Materials protection and surface technologies
 Safety of structures
 Non-destructive testing
 Accreditation, Quality in Testing

See also
 Institute for Reference Materials and Measurements
 Versailles project on advanced materials and standards

References

External links
 Federal Institute for Materials Research and Testing 

Standards organisations in Germany
Organisations based in Berlin
Government agencies established in 1954
1954 establishments in West Germany
German federal agencies
Nondestructive testing
Materials science institutes
Explosive detection
Chemical safety
Chemistry organizations
Research institutes established in 1954
Scientific organizations established in 1954
1871 in Germany